The 1975 Chico State Wildcats football team represented California State University, Chico as a member of the Far Western Conference (FWC) during the 1975 NCAA Division II football season. Led by second-year head coach Dick Trimmer, Chico State compiled an overall record of 4–6 with a mark of 2–3 in conference play, placing in a three-way tied for third in the FWC. The team was outscored by its opponents 295 to 118 for the season. The Wildcats played home games at University Stadium in Chico, California.

Schedule

Team players in the NFL
The following Chico State players were selected in the 1976 NFL Draft.

The following finished their Chico State career in 1975, were not drafted, but played in the NFL.

References

Chico State
Chico State Wildcats football seasons
Chico State Wildcats football